Masunda Lake, also known as Talavpali Lake, is a lake in Thane in the state of Maharashtra, India. The lake is home to a small island with a Shiv temple on it

History
Earlier the Masunda Lake extended up to the Kopineshwar Mandir in the east but in the 1950s, the construction of a new road drastically reduced its area.

Accessibility
Masunda lake is approximately about 15 minutes walking distance from the Thane railway station. The lake also offers recreational activities like boating.

See also 
Upvan Lake 
Railadevi Lake

References

Geography of Thane district
Lakes of Maharashtra
Lakes of Thane